Rabia Noreen is a Pakistani actress. She is known for her roles in dramas Talafi, Mera Khuda Janay, Laapata, Kasa-e-Dil and Kabhi Socha Na Tha.

Early life
Rabia was born in Karachi on December 2, 1965. She completed her studies from University of Karachi.

Career
Rabia made her debut as an actress on PTV Channel in 1987. She was known for her role in drama Zeenat. She was also very well known for her work in drama Babar, she did the role of his second wife as Ayesha Sultan which was a success. She also worked with her husband Abid Ali in several dramas. She also appeared in dramas Khaali Haath, Anaya Tumhari Hui, Kabhi Socha Na Tha, Laa, Mera Khuda Janay, Dil-e-Muztar and Mere Meherbaan. Since then she appeared in dramas Umm-e-Haniya, Baaghi, Kasa-e-Dil and Laapata.

Personal life
Rabia was married to Abid Ali till his death.

Filmography

Television

Telefilm

Film

References

External links
 

1965 births
Living people
20th-century Pakistani actresses
Pakistani television actresses
21st-century Pakistani actresses
Pakistani film actresses